The Confederate States Army revival was a series of Christian revivals which took place among the Confederate States Army in 1863. It is generally regarded as part of the Third Great Awakening.

Benjamin R. Lacy suggests that the revival began in the camps and hospitals around Richmond, Virginia. The revival began in the Army of Northern Virginia in early 1863. In March 1863, for example, a new chaplain arrived at the 41st Virginia Infantry regiment and found the beginnings of a revival. The revival was encouraged by Stonewall Jackson and Robert E. Lee and by the middle of the 1863 it had spread to all the Confederate armies. Mark Summers argues, however, that Jackson and Lee were exceptional as far as enthusiasm among the officers went, and rather than a "top down" revival (the traditional Lost Cause of the Confederacy view), it was much more "bottom up", as thousands of religious tracts were distributed among the soldiers. Summers suggests that due to the Union blockade, the soldiers had little else to read.

According to the Confederate chaplain J. William Jones, by the end of the war, 150,000 soldiers had been converted. Kurt O. Berends argues that the revivals were a major cultural event. Ben House suggests that the revivals provided "the spiritual resources that would be necessary to enable the South to survive defeat and Reconstruction with a strong Bible base still intact."

References

Further reading
 
 Carroll, Dillon J., "'The God Who Shielded Me Before, Yet Watches Over Us All': Confederate Soldiers, Mental Illness, and Religion," Civil War History, 61 (Sept. 2015), 252–80.
 Faust, Drew Gilpin. "Christian Soldiers: The Meaning of Revivalism in the Confederate Army." Journal of Southern History (1987): 63-90. online
 
 Miller, Randall M. Miller, Harry S. Stout, Charles Reagan Wilson, eds. Religion and the American Civil War (1998).
 Norton, Herman. "Revivalism in the Confederate Armies." Civil War History 6.4 (1960): 410-424. online.
 Watson, Samuel J. "Religion and combat Motivation in the Confederate Armies." The Journal of Military History 58.1 (1994): 29+.
 Woodworth, Steven E. While God Is Marching on: The Religious World of Civil War Soldiers (2001).

Christian revivals
Confederate States Army
1863 in the United States